Dun Guaidhre, also known as Dùn Ghùaidhre, is an Iron Age fort southwest of Kilmeny, Islay, Scotland. It is protected as a scheduled monument.

Local tradition associates the fort with Godred Crovan.

Citations

References

Hill forts in Scotland
Iron Age sites in Scotland
Islay
Scheduled monuments in Scotland